South Salem High School is a public high school in Salem, Oregon. It was built in 1954 as the second public high school in the city. After South Salem opened, the former Salem High School was renamed North Salem High School.

History
South Salem High School is not the first school to be built on the current site. The former Leslie Middle School was built in 1927, and South Salem was connected to it when it was constructed in 1954. The schools shared common facilities, including the cafeteria and auditorium. When the middle school was moved in 1997, the old building became home to Howard Street Charter School. The Howard Street building was demolished in 2020.

Academics
South Salem offers the International Baccalaureate program in the 11th and 12th grades, as well as a preparatory Honors program for 9th and 10th grades. The first graduating class to have spent 4 years with the IB program was the class of 2002.

In 1987, South Salem High School was honored in the Blue Ribbon Schools Program, the highest honor a school can receive in the United States.

In 2008, 78% of the school's seniors received their high school diploma. Of 466 students, 364 graduated, 69 dropped out, 1 received a modified diploma, and 32 are still in high school.

Athletics

Boys' Basketball Program
The men's basketball team has been one of the most successful programs in Oregon. South Salem has produced 15 plus D1 basketball recruits in program history. Some previous Saxon players have chosen to play at Stanford, UCLA, BYU, Oregon, Washington, Hawaii, and other schools. South Salem has won state titles in 1996 and 2004. Travis Brown has been head coach since 2019.

State Championships
 Football: 1954, 1971
 Boys tennis: 1955, 1957
 Boys track: 1959
 Boys cross country: 1959, 1960, 1962
 Boys golf: 1964, 1989, 1991, 1992
 Girls tennis: 1968
 Girls basketball: 1976, 2015, 2016
 Girls golf: 1984
 Baseball: 1991
 Boys basketball: 1996, 2004
 Boys Soccer: 2009
 Girls Softball: 2014

Music
South Salem High School's music department has been nationally recognized as a Gold school in the Grammy Signature School program. South Salem High School's top music groups, which include the symphonic choir, wind ensemble, string orchestra, and symphony orchestra, have combined for a total of 41 OSAA state championships (as of 2022), since the OSAA started sponsored music state championships starting in 1987. The Wind Ensemble also performed in Shanghai and Beijing during the 2008 Summer Olympics in China.

OSAA State Championships

Choir: 1987, 1988, 1991, 1992, 1995, 1996, 1999, 2000, 2001, 2002, 2010, 2014, 2016, 2019. (14 total state titles)

Band: 1987, 1990, 1991, 1993, 1997, 2000, 2003, 2004, 2005, 2006, 2007, 2008. (12 total state titles)

String Orchestra: 2001, 2004, 2007, 2014, 2018, 2019, 2022. (7 total state titles)

Full Orchestra: 1995, 2000, 2005, 2007, 2010, 2012, 2015, 2022. (8 total state titles)

Notable alumni

 Ann Aiken, United States District Court judge, class of 1970
 Deen Castronovo, drummer for Journey and Bad English
 Joe Douglass, American football wide receiver and linebacker
 Craig Hanneman, NFL defensive lineman, class of 1967
 Pat Healy, state finalist wrestler; current mixed martial artist formerly competing in the Ultimate Fighting Championship
 Dan Heder, producer/animator, class of 1996
 Jon Heder, actor, class of 1996
 Bob Horn, NFL linebacker, class of 1972
 William L. Sullivan, author of outdoor guide books
Stephen Thorsett, astronomer and president of Willamette University
 Michael Totten, journalist and writer

References

External links
Salem Online History: South Salem

Educational institutions established in 1954
High schools in Salem, Oregon
International Baccalaureate schools in Oregon
Public high schools in Oregon
1954 establishments in Oregon